Karim Safsaf (born 27 March 1994) is a French professional footballer who currently plays as a midfielder.

Club career

Monaco and loan to Brest
Safsaf came through the youth system at Monaco and had a short spell at Brest in 2014, but did not break into the first team at either club.

Toulouse Rodéo
He spent the 2014–15 season with CFA 2 side Toulouse Rodéo, where he scored three goals in 15 league matches

Ajaccio
He joined Ajaccio in July 2015. On 24 November 2015 Safsaf made his professional debut, coming on as a substitute for Johan Cavalli in the 1–1 draw away at Red Star.

Olimpia Itá
In July 2016, Safsaf joined Paraguayan club Olimpia Itá.

Kénitra
On 19 September 2016, Safsaf joined Moroccan club Kénitra.

Sportul Snagov
On 10 April 2019, Safsaf joined Liga II side Sportul Snagov.

Concordia Chiajna
In February 2020, Safsaf joined Liga II side Concordia Chiajna.

External links
 Karim Safsaf at foot-national.com

References 

1994 births
Living people
French footballers
Association football midfielders
French sportspeople of Moroccan descent
Championnat National 3 players
Ligue 2 players
Paraguayan División Intermedia players
Botola players
Liga II players
Toulouse Rodéo FC players
AC Ajaccio players
Club Olimpia (Itá) players
KAC Kénitra players
CS Sportul Snagov players
CS Concordia Chiajna players
Expatriate footballers in Paraguay
French expatriate sportspeople in Paraguay
Expatriate footballers in Morocco
French expatriate sportspeople in Morocco
Expatriate footballers in Romania
French expatriate sportspeople in Romania